The Heldeberg Convertible, also called the Blue Heron Convertible, is an American powered parachute, that was designed and produced by Heldeberg Designs of Altamont, New York.

Design and development
It took its name from the design feature whereby it can be fitted with a second seat for instruction or passenger carrying.

The model features a parachute-style high-wing, single seat, or optionally two-seats-in-tandem, accommodation, tricycle landing gear and a single  Rotax 503 engine in pusher configuration.

The aircraft is built from a combination of bolted aluminium and stainless steel tubing. It features a double ring propeller guard that has been roll-over tested. The  fuel tank is made from aluminium. In flight steering is accomplished via foot pedals, or optionally a control stick, that actuate the canopy brakes, creating roll and yaw. On the ground the aircraft has lever-controlled nosewheel steering. The main landing gear incorporates gas strut suspension. The aircraft is factory supplied in the form of an assembly kit that requires 30–50 hours to complete.

Originally marketed by the factory under their own name, the aircraft was later marketed under the brand name Blue Heron, although the manufacturer remained the same.

Specifications (Blue Heron Convertible)

References

1990s United States ultralight aircraft
Single-engined pusher aircraft
Powered parachutes